Spence Lake is a community in the Canadian province of Manitoba. It is located south of Meadow Portage and was likely named for a local rancher, John Spence.

Demographics 

References

 Geographic Names of Manitoba (pg. 258) - the Millennium Bureau of Canada

Designated places in Manitoba
Northern communities in Manitoba